The Citizen's Charter and Grievance Redressal Bill 2011 also known as The Right of Citizens for Time Bound Delivery of Goods and Services and Redressal of their Grievances Bill, 2011 or Citizens Charter Bill was  proposed  by Indian central legislation. It was tabled by V. Narayanasamy, Minister of State for Personnel, Public Grievances and Pensions, in Lok Sabha in December 2011. The bill lapsed due to dissolution of the 15th Lok Sabha.

Features 
The Bill seeks to confer on every citizen the right to time-bound delivery of specified goods and services and to provide a mechanism for Grievance Redressal. The Bill makes it mandatory for every public authority to publish a Citizen's Charter within six months of the commencement of the Act, failing which the official concerned would face action, including a fine of up to Rs. 50,000 from his salary and disciplinary proceedings.

The bill came after Anna Hazare asked for its provisions to be included in the Jan Lokpal Bill.

Legislation Status

External links 
 Bill Text
 Bill Summary
FDR Foundation for Democratic Reforms - Loksatta Party

See also 

 Corruption in India#Anti-corruption laws in India
 Jan Lokpal Bill

References 

Proposed laws of India
Anti-corruption measures in India
Activism
Anti-corruption agencies
 
2011 in India